The 2005–06 season was East Bengal's 10th season in the National Football League and 86th season in existence.

Competitions

Overall

Overview

Calcutta Football League

East Bengal finished the 2005 Calcutta Premier Division as runner-up with 34 points from 14 matches, 6 points behind champions Mohun Bagan.

Fixtures & results

Federation Cup

East Bengal started the Federation Cup campaign in the Pre-Quarter Finals against Air India and won 3–1 with goals from Sydney Nkalanga, Dipankar Roy and Mike Okoro. Syed Rahim Nabi scored an own-goal in the dying minutes to give consolation to Air India. In the quarter-final, however, East Bengal lost to Churchill Brothers in the sudden-death after the game ended 0–0 after 120 minutes.

Fixtures & results

IFA Shield

Group A

East Bengal was grouped alongside the other two Kolkata Giants Mohun Bagan and Mohammedan Sporting in Group A. East Bengal lost 2–3 against Mohammedan Sporting in the opening game. However, in the second game, against arch-rivals Mohun Bagan, East Bengal registered a 4–1 win with goals from Chandan Das, Mike Okoro and a brace from Alvito D'Cunha. In the semi-finals, East Bengal faced EverReady and surprisingly lost 2–1 with Chibueze Francis Maduako scoring a brace for EverReady after Kalia Kulothungan put East Bengal ahead in the 3rd minute.

Fixtures & results

Durand Cup

Group D

East Bengal was grouped alongside JCT and HAL in Group D. East Bengal won 2–0 against HAL in the opening fixture withgoals from RC Prakash and Jatin Singh Bisht. However, they lost 1–2 against JCT as they were eliminated from the group stages.

Fixtures & results

National Football League

League table

Fixtures & results

Super Cup

Since Mahindra United won both the 2005-06 National Football League and the 2005 Federation Cup, National League runner-up East Bengal faced them in the 2006 Indian Super Cup and won 2–1 with goals from Ndem Guy Herve and Alvito D'Cunha.

Fixtures & results

Statistics

Appearances
Players with no appearances are not included in the list.

Goal scorers

Notes

References

East Bengal Club seasons